Charles McNally (1787 – 21 November 1864) was the Roman Catholic Bishop of Clogher in Ireland.

Early life and education

Born at the townland of Ardaghy in County Monaghan, he entered Maynooth in 1808, aged 21 matriculating in Logic and was ordained for service in the Diocese of Clogheron 13 June 1813. In 1815 he was appointed professor of Logic, Metaphysics and Ethics, and in 1820 he was appointed Prefect of the Dunboyne Establishment at Maynooth College.

In 1843 McNally was appointed the Coadjutor Bishop of the Diocese of Clogher in Ireland succeeding less than a year later on  20 February 1844, following the death of his predecessor Bishop Edward Kernan.

Bishop of Clogher

The esteemed Irish ecclesiastical historian Donal Kerr assessed McNally as an "O'Connellite Bishop and Reforming Pastor", the son of a 'middling farmer' who grew up in the aftermath of the 1798 Rising and would live long enough to see the stirrings of the Fenian Rising.   He was O'Connellite in that he tolerated his clergy speaking on political matters, specifically the issue of the day which was the Repeal of the 1800/1 Acts of Union 1800 and in this regard he was in conflict with his Metropolitan bishop William Crolly.

He witnessed at first hand the Irish Famine and wrote of "corpses lying out in the fields...and none but the clergy can be induced to approach."

He died in office in on 21 November 1864 having served as bishop of his diocese for over twenty years. McNally was succeeded by Bishop James Donnelly.

Perhaps Bishop McNally's most enduring accomplishment is the decision to build Monaghan's St. Macartan's Cathedral.  The bishop presided at a meeting of the Catholics of Monaghan where it was resolved that a church in the town was urgently needed.  He then purchased an  site on the outskirts of the town from Humphrey Jones of Clontibret.  On 21 June 1861, the foundation stone was solemnly laid in the presence of most of the bishops of Ireland.

References

See also
Roman Catholic Diocese of Clogher

1787 births
1864 deaths
Roman Catholic bishops of Clogher
People from County Monaghan
19th-century Roman Catholic bishops in Ireland
Alumni of St Patrick's College, Maynooth
Academics of St Patrick's College, Maynooth